Melionica is a genus of moths of the family Noctuidae.

Species
 Melionica albipuncta 	(Gaede, 1916)
 Melionica bertha  (Schaus & Clements, 1893)
 Melionica citrinea 	Berio, 1970
 Melionica fletcheri 	Berio, 1973
 Melionica rubella 	Berio, 1973
 Melionica mulanjensis Hacker & Legrain, 2006
 Melionica pallescens Hacker & Legrain, 2006
 Melionica subrubella Hacker & Legrain, 2006

References
afromoths

Hadeninae
Noctuoidea genera